John Hearst may refer to:
 John Randolph Hearst, American business executive
 John Augustine Hearst, American business and media executive, film producer and philanthropist
 John E. Hearst, American-Austrian chemist

See also
 John Hurst (disambiguation)